The 2005 Pittsburgh Panthers football team represented the University of Pittsburgh in the 2005 NCAA Division I-A football season.

Schedule

Coaching staff

Team players drafted into the NFL

References

Pittsburgh
Pittsburgh Panthers football seasons
Pittsburgh Panthers football